Jalahuana or Jalahuaña (possibly from Quechua q'ala naked, nude, waña a variety of bitter potatoes used to make white ch'uñu, "naked waña potato") is a   mountain in the Andes of Peru. It is located in the Puno Region, Carabaya Province, Crucero District, and in the Sandia Province, on the border of the Limbani District and the Patambuco District.

References 

Mountains of Puno Region
Glaciers of Peru
Mountains of Peru